Thomas Watson is a co-founder and former Vice Chairman of the Omnicom Group, Inc. and consults for Omnicom on management education and leadership development as Dean Emeritus of Omnicom University, Residency and Diversity programs.

Education
Watson is a graduate of Delaware Valley College (now Delaware Valley University) and Hofstra University's Frank G. Zarb School of Business (MBA). He also received an honorary Doctorate in Humane Letters from Delaware Valley College.

Career 
Watson began his business career in 1958 in sales with Abbott Laboratories. From 1960-1963, he worked for Merck & Co. in marketing and started his advertising career with Interpublic's Erwin Wasey Agency in account management in 1963-1965. This was followed by a year with the Robert A. Becker advertising agency, before joining BBDO in 1966.

In 1986, he assisted in development of BBDO's network agency strategy, created the Network Training Program to implement the strategy and was a member of the "4101" team that created Omnicom in 1986. He has managed several OMC pro bono initiatives with Omnicom companies for the Jackie Robinson Foundation, In Roads and the Arthur Ashe Institute for Urban Health.

In 1994 he developed the Senior Management Program (SMP) for Diversified Agency Services, the largest division of Omnicom. In 2000 he expanded the SMP to include senior managers of all divisions of the company, creating "Omnicom University".

In 1999, he initiated a company global study on Employee Relationship Management and its impact on profitability, and subsequently published in David Maister's 2001 book Practice What You Preach. He wrote "People Make Profits" for Advertising Age (4/28/03) on this work. He also contributed work on "the Organization Brain" concept and organization learning at Omnicom in the 2003 book The Value Profit Chain.

Watson retired from Omnicom January 2005 and continued to run the Omnicom University as Dean in 2005.    
 
In 2006, he created the Watson Executive in Residence and Scholars Program at Delaware Valley College. He serves as Chairman of the President's Advisory Council.

He is co-manager of Two Bare Arms Productions, LLC and is the Executive Producer on "Mixed Signals": a short film shown at the Palm Springs International Film Festival, the Judee Wales CD "Love Life" and her music videos "My Other Half" and "Goldfinger".

References

Delaware Valley University alumni
Hofstra University alumni
American advertising executives
Living people
20th-century American businesspeople
21st-century American businesspeople
Year of birth missing (living people)